Jwala Ji Temple ( (Devanagari)) or Jwalamukhi Temple ( (Devanagari)) is Hindu shrine in the town of Khrew in the Pulwama district of Jammu and Kashmir, India.

The temple is dedicated to the deity Jwala Ji, the Kul Devi of many Kashmiri Hindu families.

Every year in the month of Ashadha, the Jwalamukhi Fair is held at the mandir; it exemplifies communal harmony common to the tradition of Kashmiriyat, with both Kashmiri Hindus and Kashmiri Muslim celebrating the festival.

History
The historian Kalhana refers to the village "Khrew" in the Rajatarangini as "Khaduvi" and writes of three hundred and sixty freshwater springs being present there. According to Kalhana, at the hillside to the east of the village, a mystical diagram was drawn on a rock.

Holy Spring
At the base of the hill, the shrine has a holy spring locally called Bod Nag, Aneek Nag, Anu Nag, or Nagabal. It is customary for pilgrims to perform ablutions with the water of the holy spring before entering the temple.

See also

Jwala Ji

References

Hindu temples in Jammu and Kashmir
Pulwama district
Shakti temples